Senator Cummings may refer to:

Ann Cummings (born 1946), Vermont State Senate
David C. Cummings Jr. (1861–1913), Virginia State Senate
John W. Cummings (1855–1929), Massachusetts State Senate
John Cummings (Massachusetts banker) (1812–1898), Massachusetts State Senate
Thomas L. Cummings Sr. (1891–1968), Tennessee State Senate

See also
Albert B. Cummins (1850–1926), U.S. Senator from Iowa from 1908 to 1926